Abraham "Bram" van de Beek (born 9 October 1946) is a Dutch Reformed theologian. He was a professor at Leiden University and the Vrije Universiteit Amsterdam.

Career
Van de Beek was born on 9 October 1946 in Lunteren. Between 1964 and 1970 he studied theology at Utrecht University, obtaining a master's degree under . Four years later he earned a PhD in botany under F.P. Jonker at the same university. Van de Beek then moved to Leiden University and earned a DTh in 1980 under supervision of Hendrikus Berkhof.

Van de Beek was a minister in the Dutch Reformed Church between 1970 and 1981. He then started as professor of biblical and systematic theology at Leiden University, which he would remain until 2000. In that year he became professor of Christian symbolism at the VU University Amsterdam.

In 1997 Van de Beek was elected a member of the Royal Netherlands Academy of Arts and Sciences.

References

External links
 Profile at VU University Amsterdam 

1946 births
Living people
20th-century Dutch Calvinist and Reformed ministers
Dutch Calvinist and Reformed theologians
Leiden University alumni
Academic staff of Leiden University
Members of the Royal Netherlands Academy of Arts and Sciences
Utrecht University alumni
Academic staff of Vrije Universiteit Amsterdam
People from Ede, Netherlands